Powell Township may refer to: 

 Powell Township, Craighead County, Arkansas, in Craighead County, Arkansas
 Powell Township, Comanche County, Kansas
 Powell Township, Michigan
 Powell Township, Edmunds County, South Dakota, in Edmunds County, South Dakota

Township name disambiguation pages